Architectural photography is the sub genre of the photography discipline where the primary emphasis is made to capturing photographs of buildings and similar architectural structures that are both aesthetically pleasing and accurate in terms of representations of their subjects. Architectural photographers are usually skilled in the use of specialized techniques and cameras for producing such specialized photography.

History

The first permanent photograph, View from the Window at Le Gras by Nicéphore Niépce, was also the first architectural photograph as it was a view of buildings.  Similarly, photographs taken by early photographer William Henry Fox Talbot were of architecture, including his photograph of a Latticed window in Lacock Abbey taken in 1835.

Throughout the history of photography, architectural structures including buildings have been highly valued photographic subjects, mirroring society's appreciation for architecture and its cultural significance. By the 1860s, architectural photography started to become an established visual medium.

Much as building designs changed and morphed with traditional forms, architectural photography also evolved with time. During the early-to-mid-20th century, architectural photography became more creative as photographers used diagonal lines and bold shadows in their compositions, and experimented with other innovative techniques.

By the early 1950s, architects were hiring more photographers for commissioned work, resulting in architectural photography being viewed as more of an art form than what it had been considered before.

Techniques

A tenet of architectural photography is the use of perspective control, with an emphasis on vertical lines that are non-converging (parallel). This is achieved by positioning the focal plane of the camera at so that it is perpendicular to the ground, regardless of the elevation of the camera eye. This result can be achieved by the use of view cameras, tilt/shift lenses, or post-processing.

Traditionally, view cameras have been used for architectural photography as they allow for the lens to be tilted or shifted relative to the film plane. This allows for control of perspective, as well as a variety of creative possibilities.

In a similar fashion to landscape photography, a deep depth of field is usually employed so that both the foreground and background (to infinity) are in sharp focus.

More recently, digital single lens reflex (DSLR) cameras have been used in the field of architectural photography. These cameras also employ detachable, tilt-shift lenses of varying (usually fixed) focal lengths.

When shooting interior and exterior photography is important to shoot in a wide-angle lens.

Real Estate 
Real Estate Photography is a sub genre of Architectural Photography, but different in a number of ways. While both Real Estate Photography and Architectural Photography are the practice of capturing interior and exterior photographs, the way in which the images are captured and used can vary greatly. At its core, real estate photography is used for marketing and sales, as opposed to architectural photography, which is more artistic and expressive in nature.

Even though many times the subject matter is the same, the approach used by a photographer can be different depending on if the photoshoot is considered a real estate or architectural shoot. A photographer may actually even bring completely different gear dependent on which type of shoot they have scheduled. Both the photographer and the client will have different expectations depending on the real estate vs architectural photography distinction.

Exterior and interior 
Architectural photography typically shows either the exterior or the interior of buildings. The techniques used in each of these types of photography are similar, but do have some difference and sometimes require different equipment depending upon the requirements.

Exterior 

Exterior architectural photography usually takes advantage of available light by day, or at night it uses ambient light from adjacent street lights, landscape lights, exterior building lights, moonlight and even twilight present in the sky in all but the darkest situations.

In many cases, the landscaping surrounding a building is important to the overall composition of a photograph, and even necessary to communicate the aesthetic harmony of a building with its environment.  The photographer will often include flowers, trees, fountains or statues in the foreground of a composition, taking advantage of their ability to help lead the eye into the composition and to its main subject, the building.

Aerial photography is trending as it shows different and unique perspectives of the structure being photographed. This can include getting level with the structure, showing property boundaries, revealing the location in a geographical view point, and putting context to surrounding scenery.

Interior 
Interior architectural photography can also be performed with ambient light transmitted through windows and skylights, as well as interior lighting fixtures. Frequently though, architectural photographers use supplemental lighting to improve the illumination within a building. Either electronic flash "strobes" or incandescent "hot lights" are generally used. A feature of architectural photography is that the principal subjects almost always remains stationary. It is therefore possible to use post-processing editing to achieve a balanced lighting scheme, even in the absence of additional lighting.

This combination of using natural light and artificial light is sometimes described as "flambient lighting" - a combination of the words "flash" and "ambient". The key is not letting one of the light sources over power the other. If used properly and blended well in post-processing, the result is the best lighting possible for interior photography.

Detail 
The architectural detail of a building shows a closer view of the texture and material from which they are built. This type of closer framing provides additional information on the materiality, usability and finishes of the building or property.

Trade organizations
The architectural photography as a profession is primarily represented by three trade organizations, which strive to spread best practices among architectural photographers, as well as promote the sound business practices, consistency, quality and copyright protection.

 The American Society of Media Photographers (ASMP)
 The Association of Independent Architectural Photographers (AIAP)
 The International Association of Architectural Photographers (IAAP)
 The Association of Photographers (AOP)

See also
 Architectural photographers
 Perspective control lens
 Perspective control
 View camera

References

External links
 ASMP - American Society of Media Photographers - Architectural Photographers Group 
 AIAP - The Association of Independent Architectural Photographers
 IAAP - International Association of Architectural Photographers

Photography by genre